Shelby Hearon (January 18, 1931 - December 10, 2016) was an American novelist and short story writer.

Early life
Hearon was born in 1931 in Marion, Kentucky.  She attended the University of Texas at Austin, graduating with a Bachelor of Arts in 1953.

Career
Armadillo in the Grass, her first novel, was begun in 1962 and accepted for publication by Knopf in 1967. Hearon had a teaching career at several colleges, and served on the Texas Commission on the Arts and the New York State Council on the Arts.

Awards and recognition
Hearon has been awarded fiction fellowships from the Ingram Merrill Foundation, the Guggenheim Foundation and the National Endowment for the Arts.  She has received the Texas Institute of Letters award twice, and a lifetime achievement award from the Texas Book Festival.  Five of her short stories were awarded NEA/PEN syndication Short Story Prizes and she received a NEA Creative Writing Fellowship. She has also received a New York Women in Communications Award.

Her novel Owning Jolene won an American Academy of Arts and Letters Literature Award.

Bibliography
 Armadillo in the Grass (1968)
 The Second Dune (1973)
 Hannah's House (1975)
 Now and Another Time (1976)
 A Prince of a Fellow (1978)
 Barbara Jordan, a self portrait (1979)
 Painted Dresses (1981)
 Afternoon of a Faun (1983)
 Group Therapy (1984)
 A Small Town (1985)
 500 Scorpions (1986)
 Owning Jolene (1989)
 Hug Dancing (1991)
 Life Estates (1994)
 Footprints (1996)
 Ella in Bloom (2001)
 Year of the Dog (2007)

References

External links
 Shelby Heardon 1931-2016
 A Conversation with...Shelby Hearon from The Borzoi Reader
 "Laying It All Out: Shelby Hearon Makes an Art of the Little White Lie" in the Austin Chronicle
 Hearon's Papers at the Texas State University Library - Southwestern Writers Collection
 Inventory of Hearon's papers at Harry Ransom Center at The University of Texas at Austin
 Addition to inventory of Hearon's papers at Harry Ransom Center

1931 births
2016 deaths
20th-century American novelists
21st-century American novelists
American women novelists
American women short story writers
University of Texas at Austin alumni
Novelists from Kentucky
People from Marion, Kentucky
20th-century American women writers
21st-century American women writers
20th-century American short story writers
21st-century American short story writers
Kentucky women writers